Hydrocleys is a genus of aquatic plants in the Alismataceae, native to the Western Hemisphere, though one is naturalized elsewhere and sold as an ornamental for decorative ponds and artificial aquatic habitats. At present (May 2014), five species are recognized:

References

External links 
Missouri Botanical Garden, Plant Finder, Gardening Help, water poppy

Alismataceae
Alismataceae genera
Freshwater plants